II is the second studio album by electronic trio Moderat. It was released in August 2013 on Monkeytown Records.

Track listing

Chart performance 

Moderat's album "II", released by Berlin-based Monkeytown Records, sold more than 75,000 copies over Europe, and is distributed in North America by Mute Records.

A minute of "The Mark (Interlude)", the first track from the album, was used in the 2018 science fiction horror film Annihilation.

References

2013 albums
Moderat albums
Sequel albums